Nagla is a census town in Udham Singh Nagar district in the Indian state of Uttarakhand.

Geography

Demographics
As per the 2001 Census of India, Nagla had a population of 22,944. Males constitute 55% of the population and females 45%. Nagla has an average literacy rate of 70%, higher than the national average of 59.5%: male literacy is 78%, and female literacy is 61%. In Nagla, 12% of the population is under 6 years of age.

References

Cities and towns in Udham Singh Nagar district